Hættuleg hljómsveit & glæpakvendið Stella was an album released in September 1990 by Icelandic rock singer Megas. This double CD album featured The Sugarcubes, a band led by Björk and Einar Örn Benediktsson.
Guðlaugur Kristinn Óttarsson is featured here adding guitars.

The album title means “A dangerous band & the criminal Stella”.

CD 1 - Track listing
CD length: 46:10

CD 2 - Track listing
CD length: 41:00

1990 albums
Megas albums